Motti Cohen is an Israeli police officer, who served as the 18th Commissioner of Israel Police from December 2018 to December 31, 2020.

Career 
In October 2014, Cohen was made Head of the Central District Police.

Commissioner of Israel Police 
Cohen was appointed Commissioner of Israel Police in December 2018, succeeding Roni Alsheikh.

In November 2019, Cohen backed Lahav 433 after 80 former senior police officers wrote an open letter condemning "violent discourse against police and law enforcement agencies".

Cohen's term as Commissioner was set to expire on September 30, 2020. However, he was handed an extension until March 30, 2021 or until a  permanent replacement is appointed.

In October 2020, Cohen dismissed accusations Israel Police were heavy handed in policing protesters at anti-Netanyahu demonstrations.

Cohen term as Commissioner of Israel Police ended on December 31, 2020. He was succeeded by Kobi Shabtai.

References 

Year of birth missing (living people)
Living people
Israeli police chiefs